The Terre Haute Phillies were a baseball team in Terre Haute, Indiana from 1946 to 1954.  They were a Three-I League team affiliated with the Philadelphia Phillies. They became the Terre Haute Tigers for the 1955–1956 seasons when the affiliation changed to the Detroit Tigers.Their games were played at Memorial Stadium ballpark in Terre Haute.

The ballpark

Terre Haute teams played at Memorial Stadium , located at the corner of Home and Wabash. Today, the site is the football stadium for Indiana State University, but the original arches from the old stadium remain.

Notable alumni
 Willie Jones (1947) 2 x MLB All-Star
 Hub Kittle (1953-1954, MGR)
 Stan Lopata (1946) 2 x MLB All-Star
 Charlie Metro (1956)
 Pat Riley (batboy 1949)
 Bob Miller (1948-1949)
 Bubba Morton (1956)
 Skeeter Newsome (1951-1952, MGR)
 Stubby Overmire (1955)
 Jim Owens (1953)

Year-by-year record

References

Defunct minor league baseball teams
Defunct baseball teams in Indiana
Professional baseball teams in Indiana
Philadelphia Phillies minor league affiliates
1946 establishments in Indiana
1956 disestablishments in Indiana
Illinois-Indiana-Iowa League teams
Baseball teams established in 1946
Baseball teams disestablished in 1956
Terre Haute, Indiana